Long Way to the Top was a six-part weekly Australian Broadcasting Corporation (ABC) documentary film series on the history of Australian rock and roll, from 1956 to the modern era, it was initially broadcast from 8 August to 12 September 2001.
One of its writers, James Cockington, provided a book tie-in, Long Way to the Top: Stories of Australian Rock & Roll (2001). Another series writer, and interviewer, Clinton Walker, compiled a 2-disc CD soundtrack album, Long Way to the Top: Original Soundtrack from the ABC-TV Series (13 August 2001), by Various Artists, which featured in the show. It peaked at No. 9 on the ARIA Albums Chart. A year later a related national concert tour followed.

History 

Long Way to the Top took its name from the AC/DC song, "It's a Long Way to the Top (If You Wanna Rock 'n' Roll)" (December 1975). The six-part series was produced by Paul Clarke (Recovery), directed by Greg Appel and edited by Andrew Glover. It was narrated by former radio presenter Chris Winter (one of the original members of the on-air team at the ABC's 24-hour rock radio station, Double Jay).

It featured interviews with Australasian singers and instrumentalists. Most of the nearly 200 interviews were conducted by music critic Clinton Walker, who also co-wrote the series, and compiled a 2-disc CD soundtrack album, Long Way to the Top: Original Soundtrack from the ABC-TV Series (13 August 2001), by Various Artists featured in the show. It peaked at No. 9 on the ARIA Albums Chart. The other writers were Tony Barrell, Sandy Webster, James Cockington and Laurie Zion. Cockington wrote a book tie-in, Long Way to the Top: Stories of Australian Rock & Roll (2001).

The original series was well received for the ABC when shown in 2001; a national concert tour in 2002 followed.

At the ARIA Music Awards of 2003 the live album won Cast or Show Album.

Episode list

Concert tour 

In 2002, the promoters Michael Chugg and Kevin Jacobsen decided to build on the popularity of the show, by sending a package tour of artists featured in the program on a national concert tour of Australia. The tour featured Col Joye, Lonnie Lee, Judy Stone, Ray Columbus & the Invaders, Lucky Starr, Billy Thorpe and the Aztecs, Little Pattie, The Masters Apprentices, Stevie Wright, Daddy Cool, Russell Morris. Axiom, Spectrum, Chain, Brian Cadd, Lobby Loyde, Normie Rowe, The Atlantics, The Twilights, Kevin Borich, Max Merritt, Tamam Shud, John Paul Young, Dinah Lee and Marcia Hines. The tour proved to be successful,  taking receipts of $10 million with a budget of $4.5 million. The ABC broadcast, highlights of the tour and subsequent CD and DVD packages went on sale.

The popularity of the tour resulted in the Countdown Spectacular tours in 2006 and 2007.

A second tour was staged in 2012 for the tenth anniversary. It featured Axiom, Brian Cadd, Dragon, Marcia Hines, Col Joye, Jim Keays, Dinah Lee, Mi-Sex, Russell Morris, Ian Moss, Noiseworks, Doug Parkinson, Little Pattie, Glenn Shorrock, Spectrum, Lucky Starr, Matt Taylor. Phil Manning and John Paul Young.

References

External links 

  archived from the original on 1 October 2002.

Australian Broadcasting Corporation original programming
2000s Australian documentary television series
Australian music television series